Swordsman (Jacques Duquesne) is a fictional character appearing in American comic books published by Marvel Comics. He first appeared in The Avengers #19 (August 1965) and was created by Stan Lee and Don Heck. Although he was first introduced as an enemy of Hawkeye and the Avengers, the character has since appeared as both a supervillain and a superhero.

Tony Dalton portrays a variation of the character, renamed Jack Duquesne, in the Marvel Cinematic Universe / Disney+ series Hawkeye (2021).

Publication history
The Swordsman first appeared as a supervillain in The Avengers #19 (1965). He went on to appear in The Avengers #20, 30, 38, 65, 78 and 79 (1965–1970). The Swordsman changed his ways and became a superhero in The Avengers #100 (1972) and later became a member of the Avengers in The Avengers #112–130 (1973–1974), Defenders #9–11 (1973), Captain Marvel #32–33 (1974), Fantastic Four #150 (1974), Giant-Size Avengers #2 (1974) and Avengers Spotlight #22 (1989). Later, the Cotati-possessed Swordsman appeared in The Avengers #134, 135, 157, 160 (1975–1977), Giant-Size Avengers #4 (1975) and West Coast Avengers (vol. 2) #39 (1988).

The Swordsman has been a member of various supervillain groups, including the Lethal Legion in The Avengers #78–79 (1970) and Iron Man Annual #7 (1984), the Emissaries of Evil in Alpha Flight Special (vol. 2) #1 (1992), and the Legion of the Unliving in The Avengers Annual #16 (1987), Avengers West Coast #61 (1990) and Avengers (vol. 3) #10–11 (1998).

Introduced as a villainous counterpart to Hawkeye in the pages of The Avengers, the Swordsman went on to appear in Hawkeye #1 (1983), Solo Avengers #2 (1988), Hawkeye (vol. 3) #3 (2004) and Hawkeye: Blindspot #1 (2011) as part of Hawkeye's origins. The Swordsman also battled Captain America in Tales of Suspense #88 (1967) and Captain America #105 (1968).

The 2010–2011 crossover storyline Chaos War saw the return of the Swordsman. He was one of the central characters in the tie-in series Chaos War: Dead Avengers (2010–2011). The Swordsman also featured in Chaos War #2 & 4–5 (2010–2011) and Chaos War: Ares #1 (2010).

Fictional character history
Jacques Duquesne grew up as a privileged youth in the (fictional) Southeast Asian nation of Siancong, then under French rule. Unlike his father and other European residents, Duquesne held no prejudice against the Siancongese natives, and after performing an act of kindness for a native servant, he was invited to join a communist rebellion against French rule. As the costumed Swordsman, Duquesne, fancying himself a swashbuckling freedom fighter, helped liberate Siancong, only to learn the rebel leader Wong Chu had killed Duquesne's father. Devastated and disillusioned, Duquesne departed Siancong to seek adventure. Nothing else is known of Duquesne's early career, but he eventually joined the Carson Carnival of Traveling Wonders; although his swordplay made him one of the carnival's star attractions, he gradually descended into gambling and drunkenness, his youthful idealism long behind him.

Eventually Duquesne, by now in his thirties or older, took a young runaway named Clint Barton under his wing and taught him how to use bladed weapons, while another performer, Trick Shot, taught Barton archery, at which he proved to be a master. The young Clint stumbled upon Duquesne stealing money from the carnival's paymaster to pay a gambling debt. Clint attempted to turn his mentor over to the law, but he was pursued by Duquesne and badly beaten. Before Duquesne could deliver the fatal blow, Trick Shot stepped in to save the young boy. Duquesne then fled the carnival and adapted his swordsplay act to become a costumed supervillain.

Years later, the Swordsman attempted to join the Avengers (whose members included Clint Barton, now known as the superhero Hawkeye) to take advantage of the benefits that go with an Avenger ID. He was refused entry into the team, largely due to Hawkeye's protests and the fact he was wanted in different states, and threatened to kill Captain America after capturing him, but the rest were able to rescue him. After failing the first time around, he was accepted into the Avengers. However, he was secretly an agent of the Mandarin, who had teleported him to his castle before the Avengers could capture him, and created a pseudo-image of Iron Man to recommend the Swordsman to the Avengers. The Mandarin also fitted the Swordsman's sword with extra powers, such as firing artificial lightning bolts, though he warned the Swordsman if they were ever pointed at him they would reverse. Soon after joining the Avengers, the Swordsman revealed his true intentions and betrayed the team, planting a bomb on the control panels which could be activated by remote-control. He soon had a change of heart and betrayed the Mandarin to save the Avengers. Despite his heroics, the Swordsman left the ranks of the Avengers, knowing the Mandarin would now be against him.

The Swordsman went back to being a supervillain for hire and battled the Avengers on numerous occasions. Under Black Widow's leadership, the Swordsman teamed with the original Power Man and fought the superhero team, capturing nearly all of its members. With Power Man, he fought against Captain America as agents of the Red Skull. The Swordsman also participated in the Mandarin's attempt at world conquest, along with other villains. He later battled Captain America again, as a member of Batroc's Brigade, was employed by Egghead where he battled Hawkeye (in his Goliath persona). Along with Power Man, the Swordsman joined the supervillain group the Lethal Legion and battled the Avengers. Eventually, the Swordsman briefly rejoined the Avengers in a war against Ares in Olympus. Later, he met with Mantis, an ally of the Avengers, and then rejoined the Avengers after he secretly fell in love with her. He subsequently participated in the Avengers/Defenders war.

In his last mission, Duquesne aided the Avengers in the conflict that involved Kang's quest for the "Celestial Madonna". To facilitate his plans, Kang had captured the Avengers present at the time – Vision, Thor, Iron Man, Mantis, The Scarlet Witch, and their guest Agatha Harkness – but left Swordsman behind because he considered him useless. Humiliated but determined to show Kang his true worth, Swordsman tracked the captive Avengers to Kang's pyramid base in Gizeh, where he encountered Rama-Tut, Kang's chronological alter ego. With his help and the assistance of Hawkeye, who had just returned from a leave of absence, Swordsman managed to free his fellow Avengers. It was later revealed that Mantis was in fact the "Celestial Madonna". After Kang's plans were foiled and he decided not to leave the Madonna to anyone else, the Swordsman sacrificed his life by intercepting Kang's energy blast which was meant for Mantis.

Mantis soon after married the eldest of Earth's alien Cotati, who had resurrected and possessed the Swordsman's corpse and infused a portion of its own consciousness into it. Mantis and Swordsman went on to have a son together called Sequoia who became the Celestial Messiah. After battling the Avengers, the Cotati-possessed Swordsman crumbled to dust.

During the Chaos War storyline, Swordsman is among the deceased heroes released by Pluto to defend the Underworld from Amatsu-Mikaboshi. Returning to Earth, the Swordsman joins a team of "dead" Avengers, led by Captain Mar-Vell, who take it upon themselves to protect their unconscious teammates from the Grim Reaper. After the battle only the Swordsman and the Rita DeMara Yellowjacket remained.

In the "Road to Empyre," the eldest of Earth's Cotati still using the Swordsman's body and Sequoia have reappeared on the Blue Area of the Moon after the oxygen-rich area was revitalized. They request the Avengers help to avoid another Cotati massacre by the Kree/Skrull Alliance. However, it quickly transpires that the Cotati are deceiving the Avengers and seek to exterminate all 'meat'-based life, starting with humanity. The Swordsman is confronted in Wakanda by the Black Panther who destroys him.

Powers and abilities
The Swordsman is an Olympic level athlete with no superhuman powers, and is a cunning strategist with phenomenal reflexes and highly adept at unarmed combat. The Swordsman is a master in the uses of bladed weapons, especially swords and knives, and his main weapon is a sword modified by the super-villain Mandarin from Makluan technology. By pressing one of the buttons on the sword's hilt, the Swordsman can project a concussive force beam, a disintegrating ray, a large jet of flame, electrical energy in a form resembling lightning, or a stream of nerve gas that induced temporary unconsciousness. He also carries various throwing knives and daggers as needed.

Other characters named Swordsman

Philip Javert
Philip Javert, a Swordsman from an alternate universe, was a member of the Gatherers. The Gatherers were brought together by Proctor (an alternate version of the Black Knight) to hunt down every Sersi throughout the multiverse. Proctor and the Gatherers travelled to the mainstream Marvel Universe (Earth-616) to kill its version of Sersi. The Swordsman, along with fellow Gatherers member Magdalene, turned against Proctor and briefly joined the mainstream version of the Avengers. Some years later, they would team with the Avengers and the Squadron Supreme and leave Earth-616 for parts unknown.

Andreas von Strucker

Swordswoman
A new heroine named Swordswoman later appears as a member of the European superhero team known as Euroforce. She is later revealed to be Marjorie, the Swordsman's illegitimate teenage daughter from Paris.

Villainous Swordsman
A new Swordsman later appears, wielding a vibranium alloy katana and claiming to have inherited the mantle of Jacques Duquesne. He attempts to extort money from the town of Sauga River by threatening to flood it, but is defeated by Captain America.

Other versions

Marvel Zombies
A zombified Swordsman is seen attacking and devouring Magneto. After Magneto's defeat, Swordsman otherwise made a cameo appearance. He then attempted, unsuccessfully, to slay the Ultimate Universe's Fantastic Four, ending with him temporarily blinded by Ultimate Invisible Woman. And he also attempted to slay the Silver Surfer, though that was unsuccessful, too; he was killed when he is literally torn apart by the Power Cosmic energy.

Heroes Reborn
A version of the Swordsman appears as a native of the "Heroes Reborn" world, which was created by Franklin Richards. He and his world were created after the Avengers "died" battling Onslaught. This version of Swordsman wielded Black Knight's Ebony Blade. When the Avengers encountered and fought against Kang and Mantis, Swordsman appeared to remember his previous life despite being a construct created by Franklin. This version later adopted the guise of Deadpool.

House of M
In the House of M reality, the Swordsman was a member of Shang-Chi's Dragons criminal organization, alongside Colleen Wing, Mantis, Zaran and Machete. He was killed by Bullseye when the Dragons are ambushed by the Kingpin's assassins.

In other media

Television
 The Swordsman appeared in the "Captain America" and "Avengers" segments of The Marvel Super Heroes, voiced by Ed McNamara.
 The Swordsman appeared in The Avengers: United They Stand episode "Comes a Swordsman", voiced by Paul Essiembre. He assists Ringmaster and the Circus of Crime in a plot to steal mythrax bacteria. When the Avengers get involved, Swordsman escapes to deliver the bacteria to Zodiac, who subsequently kill him.
 A variation of the Swordsman named Jack Duquesne appears in the Marvel Cinematic Universe / Disney+ series Hawkeye, portrayed by Tony Dalton. This version has no ties to Clint Barton and is the fiancé of Kate Bishop's widowed mother Eleanor.

Video games
 The Swordsman appears as an unlockable playable character in Lego Marvel's Avengers.

References

External links
 Swordsman (Jacques Duquesne) at Marvel.com
 Swordsman (Jacques Duquesne) at Marvel.wikia.com
 Swordsman (Philip Javert) at Marvel.wikia.com

Characters created by Don Heck
Characters created by Stan Lee
Comics characters introduced in 1965
Fictional blade and dart throwers
Fictional circus performers
Fictional swordfighters in comics
Marvel Comics martial artists
Marvel Comics superheroes
Marvel Comics supervillains